Juan Jose Aizcorbe Torra (born 9 July 1959) is a Spanish politician and lawyer who is a deputy in the Congress of Deputies for the Vox party.

Biography
Torra holds a law degree from the University of Barcelona and a master's in business studies ESIC University in Madrid. He was called to the bar in Barcelona before working as a lawyer specializing in bankruptcy law in the private sector.

He describes himself as a practicing Catholic and is married with three children.

Political career
He was associated to the Juntas Españolas in Barcelona, but left the organisation after describing it as too radical and joined the People's Party. In 1998, he led the Spanish Democratic Party (PADE) in Catalonia.

Since 2018, he has been a member of Vox and was elected to the Congress of Deputies in the November 2019 Spanish general election for the Barcelona constituency.

References

1959 births
Spanish people of Catalan descent
Spanish Roman Catholics
Vox (political party) politicians
Members of the 14th Congress of Deputies (Spain)
Living people